Calleary is an Irish surname. Notable people with the surname include:

Dara Calleary (born 1973), Irish politician
Phelim Calleary (1895–1974), Irish politician
Seán Calleary (1931–2018), Irish politician

Anglicised Irish-language surnames
Surnames of Irish origin